Sporting Club de Paris is a French Futsal club, based in Paris in the 13th district, and having the emblem of the Sporting CP as an official affiliate. Sporting is a quadruple Championnat winner in France as well as a four-time winner of the Coupe de France de Futsal.

Sporting Club de Paris is the French club's most successful futsal and continuously represents France in the UEFA Futsal Cup, the most prestigious European competition for futsal.

Honors
Division 1 Futsal: 5
 2010-11, 2011-12, 2012-13, 2013-14, 2021-22
Coupe de France: 6
 2009-10, 2010-11, 2011-12, 2012-13, 2014-15, 2018-19

Current squad

UEFA Club Competitions record
Appearances: 5

References

External links
 Club's official site 
Futsal clubs in France
Futsal clubs established in 2008
2008 establishments in France
Sports clubs in Paris